Marinka may refer to:

 Marinka (operetta), an operetta by Emmerich Kálmán
 Schizothorax, a genus of fish
 Marinka, Bulgaria, a village in Bulgaria
 Marinka, Ukraine, a city in Ukraine
 Marinka Raion, whose seat is Marinka, Ukraine
 Rinrin Marinka (born 1978), Indonesian chef